The Pamiri rubab (Russian and Tajiki: рубоб) is a fretless six-strung lute, carved from a single piece of wood with a skin head. It is played in the Badakhshan region of Tajikistan, as part of the Pamiri musical tradition.

The Pamiri rubab has six gut strings or nylon strings, one of which, rather than running from the head to the bridge, is attached partway down the neck, similar to the fifth string of the American banjo.  The instrument is primarily used for drone and rhythm accompaniment, for instance accompanying spoken or sung poetry. The rubab is played for the way it sounds, the gut strings emitting a "less strident sound" than that produced by a metal strung instrument.

References

External links
Site with picture of Pamiri rubab
Site with picture of Pamiri rubab

Drumhead lutes
Pamiri people
Tajik musical instruments